Central Español Fútbol Club, usually known simply as Central Español is a Uruguayan football club based in Montevideo.

History

The F.U.F era
Together with Peñarol, Central founded FUF (Uruguayan football federation) in 1923 after being expelled from AUF. The FUF even made a parallel Uruguay national team (dissident to AUF) that played several international games based on Peñarol and Central squads. After 3 years of existence the new federation was dissolved and both teams returned to AUF.

Merging
Central append "Español" to its name after an agreement signed with a Spanish group in 1971. Central itself was born from a merge between "Solís Bochas" and "Soriano Polideportivo".

Champions
In 1984 Central Español won their only Uruguayan championship to date. The team was managed by Líber Arispe during campaign.

Titles
Primera División (1)
 1984

Segunda División Uruguay: (3)
 1961, 1983, 2011–12

Tercera División Uruguay: 11928 (as Central FC)

Performance in CONMEBOL competitionsCopa Sudamericana: 1 appearance'''
2006: First Round

Current squad

Managers
 Julio Antúnez (July 2005–Dec 06)
 Gustavo Díaz (Jan 2008–March 8)
 Julio Antúnez (March 2008–June 8)
 Mario Saralegui (Dec 2009–March 10)
 Daniel Sánchez (March 2010–June 11)
 Darlyn Gayol (July 2011–Feb 13)
 Julio Acuña (Feb 2013–April 13)
 Óscar Pacheco (April 2013–)
Maxi Viera (June 2022)

External links

 

 
Football clubs in Uruguay
Association football clubs established in 1905
1905 establishments in Uruguay